This is a list of the 100 largest populated places in Libya. Some places in the list could be considered suburbs or neighborhoods of some large cities in the list, so this list is not definitive.

Source:Amraja M. el Khajkhaj, "Noumou al Mudon as Sagheera fi Libia", Dar as Saqia, Benghazi-2008, pp. 118-123.

See also
Transliteration of Libyan placenames
List of metropolitan areas in Africa
List of largest cities in the Arab world

References

External links

 
Libya, List of cities in
Libya
Cities